Dinothrombium is a genus of mites belonging to the family Trombidiidae.

Species

The following species are recognised in the genus Dinothrombium:

Dinothrombium brevipilum 
Dinothrombium colhuanum 
Dinothrombium corpulentum 
Dinothrombium crassipalpe (Trägårdh, 1904)
Dinothrombium dammermani Vitzhum, 1926
Dinothrombium dugesi (Trouessart, 1894)
Dinothrombium eupectum (Leonardi, 1901)
Dinothrombium gigas (Trouessart, 1894)
Dinothrombium oparbellae (André, 1949)
Dinothrombium pandorae (Newell & Tevis, 1960)
Dinothrombium pedioculatum (André, 1927)
Dinothrombium southcotti Fain, 1991
Dinothrombium superbum (Banks, 1910)
Dinothrombium tarsale (Berlese, 1916)
Dinothrombium tinctorum (Linnaeus, 1767)
Dinothrombium torridum Hirst, 1928
Dinothrombium trispilum (Berlese, 1916)
Dinothrombium zarniki (Krausse, 1916)

References

Trombidiidae